Concept of One is the debut album of the dance-pop and freestyle music group Concept of One, created by music producer Tony Moran. The album was released on 16 July 1993 by the Cutting Records label. It included the first hit single released by Tony Moran, "Dance with Me", and the song "The Question", which featured the participation of singer Noel Pagan.

Track listing

Chart performance
Singles - Billboard

References

External links
Allmusic.com

1993 albums
Concept of One albums